The Samsung SGH-G600 is a mobile phone manufactured by Samsung Electronics.
The handset comes with a free 1 GB or 512 MB microSD card, depending on country of purchase.  The phone comes with a free bluetooth headset (WEP-210), also depending on country of purchase, and is the fourth phone released to have Schneider Kreuznach Optics.

External links 
 Product page at Samsung.com

References 

G600
Mobile phones introduced in 2007
Slider phones